The 1974 Amco Cup was the 1st edition of the NSWRFL Midweek Cup, a NSWRFL-organised national club Rugby League tournament between the leading clubs and representative teams from the NSWRFL, the CRL and the NZRL.

A total of 21 teams from across New South Wales and New Zealand played 20 matches in a straight knock-out format, with the matches being held midweek during the premiership season.

The Competition was originally going to have the 12 NSWRFL Premiership teams, the top 4 Brisbane Rugby League teams and the top 4 Country Divisional teams from the previous year. 
But when the Brisbane Rugby League teams and the winner of the 1973 CRL Championship, Newcastle declined to participate in the tournament, the remaining CRL Divisional teams, the 1973 New Zealand Inter-District Premiers, Auckland and the 1973 NSWRFL Second Division Runners-Up, Ryde-Eastwood were invited to compete instead.

Qualified Teams

1 Replaced Wentworthville who declined to participate.

Venues

Round 1

Round 2

Finals

 *- advanced after a penalty count-back

Awards

Golden Try
 Malcolm Reilly (Manly-Warringah)

References

Amco Cup
Am
1974 in New Zealand rugby league